An XML 1.0 based markup language for web server log reports, that allows automated data mining and report generation. LOGML is based on XGMML for graph description.

See also
XGMML
List of markup languages

External links
 Cover Pages: Log Markup Language (LOGML)

XML markup languages
Computer file formats